Eucharia Njideka Iyiazi (born 19 November 1973) is a Paralympian athlete from Nigeria competing mainly in category F57/58 shot put and discus throw events. She has competed at four paralympics taking two gold, a silver and two bronze medals.

Iyiazi competed in the 2008 Summer Paralympics in Beijing, China. There, she won a gold medal in both the women's shot put F57/F58 event and the women's discus throw F57/F58 event. At the Beijing Paralympics, Iyiazzi set the world and Paralympic record for the F58 class in shot put and discus.

Iyiazi took a bronze medal in the 2012 Summer Paralympics in London and then threw 27.54m to again take the discus bronze at the 2016 Summer Paralympics.

She won a gold medal in the women's F55-57 shot put at the 2022 Commonwealth Games (CWG) in Birmingham on 6 August 2022 with a throw of 10.03meters. It was Nigeria's eighth gold medal at the 2022 CWG. She had formerly won a bronze medal at Tokyo Olympic games.

References

External links
 

1973 births
Living people
Nigerian female discus throwers
Nigerian javelin throwers
Nigerian female shot putters
Nigerian disabled sportspeople
Paralympic athletes of Nigeria
Paralympic gold medalists for Nigeria
Paralympic silver medalists for Nigeria
Paralympic bronze medalists for Nigeria
Paralympic medalists in athletics (track and field)
Athletes (track and field) at the 2008 Summer Paralympics
Athletes (track and field) at the 2004 Summer Paralympics
Athletes (track and field) at the 2016 Summer Paralympics
Athletes (track and field) at the 2020 Summer Paralympics
Medalists at the 2004 Summer Paralympics
Medalists at the 2008 Summer Paralympics
Medalists at the 2012 Summer Paralympics
Medalists at the 2016 Summer Paralympics
Medalists at the 2020 Summer Paralympics
Commonwealth Games medallists in athletics
Commonwealth Games gold medallists for Nigeria
Athletes (track and field) at the 2006 Commonwealth Games
African Games bronze medalists for Nigeria
African Games medalists in athletics (track and field)
Athletes (track and field) at the 2015 African Games
20th-century Nigerian women
21st-century Nigerian women
Medallists at the 2022 Commonwealth Games